Trevor Nyasha Garwe (born 27 June 1986) is a Zimbabwean international former cricketer. He played domestic cricket for the Mashonaland Eagles. Garwe made his One Day International debut for Zimbabwe in October 2009 against Kenya.

External links
Cricinfo profile
Cricket Archive profile

Zimbabwean cricketers
Zimbabwe One Day International cricketers
Mashonaland cricketers
Sportspeople from Harare
1986 births
Living people